This article contains a list of episodes of the United States television series Jake and the Fatman, which were broadcast on CBS between 1987 and 1992.

Series Overview

Episodes

Pilot-Matlock (1986)

Season 1 (1987–88)

Season 2 (1989)

Season 3 (1989–90)

Season 4 (1990–91)
"It Never Entered My Mind" served as a back-door pilot for Diagnosis: Murder.

Season 5 (1991–92)

References

Jake and the Fatman